Krichauff may refer to:
 Friedrich Krichauff (1824–1904), South Australian politician
 Friedrich C. Krichauff(1861–1954), Australian architect, philatelist and photographer, son of the above
 Mount Mary, South Australia, a town named Krichauff until 1918
 Krichauff Range southwest of Alice Springs in the Northern Territory containing Palm Valley (Northern Territory)